Brooks may refer to:

Places
Antarctica
Cape Brooks

Canada
Brooks, Alberta

United States
Brooks, Alabama
Brooks, Arkansas
Brooks, California
Brooks, Georgia
Brooks, Iowa
Brooks, Kentucky
Brooks, Maine
Brooks Township, Michigan
Brooks, Minnesota
Brooks, Montana
Brooks, Oregon
Brooks, San Antonio, Texas
Brooks City-Base, built on former United States Air Force base near San Antonio, Texas
Brooks, Wisconsin
Brooks Lake, a lake in Minnesota
United States and Canada
The Brooks Range, mountain range in Alaska and Yukon

People
 Brooks (given name)
 Brooks (surname)
 Brooks (DJ), Dutch DJ, producer and musician

Fictional characters
 Brooks Hatlen, in the 1994 film The Shawshank Redemption, played by James Whitmore
 Constance "Connie" Brooks (see Our Miss Brooks), fictional English language teacher
 Dustin Brooks, in the TV series Power Rangers Ninja Storm
 Earl Brooks, the title character of Mr. Brooks, a film
 Blade (character), also known as Eric Brooks in the Marvel Universe
 Blade (New Line Blade franchise character), the New Line Cinema adaptation of Blade, portrayed by Wesley Snipes and Sticky Fingaz, from whom the Eric Brooks name originates

Companies
 Brooks Automation, provider of automation, vacuum and instrumentation solutions
 Brooks Brothers, American men's clothier
 Brooks England, manufacturer of traditional English bicycle saddles
 Brooks Instrument, manufacturer of flow control and measurement equipment
 Brooks Locomotive Works, an early manufacturer of steam locomotives for the US railroads
 Brooks Pharmacy, former pharmacy chain
 Brooks Sports, American athletic shoe manufacturer

Education
 Brooks High School (disambiguation)
 Brooks College, a defunct for-profit college in California
 Brooks College of Health, a college of University of North Florida
 Brooks Institute, a for-profit college in California focusing on visual arts
 Brooks School, North Andover, Massachusetts, United States

Other uses
 Brooks (band), a 1970s UK vocal group
 Comet Brooks (disambiguation), various comets
 Brooks (mango), a late-season mango cultivar originated in Miami, Florida
 An early, minor league name for the Brooklyn Dodgers, former Major League Baseball team, now the Los Angeles Dodgers
 Brooks (crater), a crater on the southwestern part Mercury

See also 
 Brock (disambiguation)
 Brooks Creek (disambiguation)
 Brooks's, a gentlemen's club in St James's Street, London
 Brooksville (disambiguation)
 Brook (disambiguation)